West Coast Railway was a passenger train company operating in Victoria, Australia that operated services between Melbourne and Warrnambool from September 1993 until August 2004. The travel time for the journey (Warrnambool – Melbourne) was around 3 hours. This is on average around 30 minutes quicker than the current journeys.

History

West Coast Railway was formed in 1993 when the Kennett State Government offered long-distance country rail services previously run by the government-owned operator V/Line to private operators. Bids were lodged in February 1993 and West Coast Railway was announced as the successful tender on 30 April the same year. The initial franchise was for eight years with operations commencing on 19 September 1993. Subsequently, a three-year extension was negotiated.

While most other rail services tendered were replaced by road coach services, West Coast Railway successfully tendered to retain a rail service. During the 11 years of WCR operation of the line, patronage increased by 20%. The first rail service under WCR operated on 19 September when V/Line locomotive N466 hauled the 17:00 Warrnambool to Melbourne Spencer Street service.

In August 2001, Connex purchased a 50% shareholding. Donald Gibson and Gary McDonald continued to hold the other 50% shareholding. In 2003, Connex sold its shareholding to Australian Public Trustees.

In 2001, the two directors of the company Gibson and McDonald bought a 50% share in Tranz Scenic, the national passenger operator in New Zealand, withdrawing some long-distance trains that were not profitable. In May 2004, the TranzScenic shareholding was sold back to Toll NZ.

Rolling stock

West Coast Railway operated rolling stock that was notable for being largely made up of 50 year old locomotives including a steam locomotive and some rolling stock bought from V/Line. This replaced the 1980s-built locomotives and rolling stock that had previously operated on the line. This was in contrast to the successful tenderer for the Shepparton line rail service from Hoys Roadlines, who decided to lease rolling stock from V/Line.

The locomotives purchased from V/Line were:

B class locomotives: B61, B64 (never restored to service), B65, B75 (also never restored to service), B76 and B80 (restored for failed South Australian Tourist Venture: The Murraylander)
S class locomotives: S300, S302, S311 and S312 (never restored to service)
T class locomotives T363, T369 and T385

The carriages purchased were S and Z type steel-bodied passenger carriages built between 1937 and 1959.

They also purchased a Western Australian Government Railways Commissioner's carriage WAL 951.

A blue, white, yellow and grey livery was adopted.

The first locomotive to be fully overhauled by was S300 which begun trials on 23 January 1995, entering regular service two weeks later. 
The railway depot at Ballarat East was leased by the company as its heavy maintenance base, with transfer runs being made via the Geelong to Ballarat line.

Specially modified R class steam locomotives were also used to operate a Saturday return service, becoming the fastest regular steam hauled passenger service in the world. R711 entered service on regular trains on 21 November 1998 and was fitted with multiple unit control equipment for diesel electric locomotives. It was followed by R766 in 2001.

As well as operating regular Warrnambool passenger services, West Coast Railway also ran charter services and operated special excursion trains to various destinations within Victoria, often in conjunction with The South Western Railway Society. The company assisted with the restoration of a number of steam locomotives, with R711 and Y112 made operational, and work being carried out on J536, D3 638, D3 641, and A2 986.

The company also took advantage of Victoria's newly privatised rail freight market by hiring its T class locomotives and occasionally its mainline fleet of B class and S class, to freight operators.

Demise
West Coast Railway encountered a series of operational difficulties during 2003/04 which adversely affected its business. 
The death of one of the company's founding principals, Gary McDonald, on 25 April 2003 removed the guiding light and spirit of the company. The closure of the Warrnambool line between Melbourne and Geelong for five weeks in January and February 2004, to allow its rebuilding as part of the 160 km/h (100 mph) Regional Fast Rail project, meant that the company had to replace rail services with road coaches during the period of the works, with a resulting drop in passenger numbers.

In May 2004 (two months after rail services had resumed), the Victorian Department of Infrastructure issued an alert on stress cracks on the underframes of the B class and S class locomotives, including the units owned by West Coast Railway. Once again the company was forced to replace two of its three daily-return rail services with road coaches.

There had also been a change in government transport policy following the election of the Bracks State Government. In light of the failure of privatisation of V/Line Passenger, then Opposition transport spokesman Geoff Leigh predicting the proposed re-tendering of statewide regional rail operations in 2006 would result in West Coast Railway being "executed".

Although West Coast Railway stated as late as May 2004 its intention to negotiate a new contract to operate Warrnambool services beyond the expiry of its existing contract in June 2004, with the expected locomotive repair bill to be in excess of $1 million it decided not to seek a renewal. On 31 August 2004, West Coast Railway operated its final services with V/Line resuming services the following day.

Most of the diesel locomotives were sold to Chicago Freight Car Leasing Australia. R711 was allocated to Steamrail Victoria by its owners.

Steamrail Westcoaster
Beginning in 2018, the heritage rail tour company Steamrail Victoria introduced a new tour named the "Warrnambool Westcoaster" to Warrnambool as a special homage to the former regular steam services of West Coast Railway. The tour was hauled by ex-West Coast engine R711, which was allocated to Steamrail in 2004 and re-entered service in 2011. Originally operated as a charter for local resident and Steamrail volunteer Edward White, the tour was deemed extremely popular, becoming part of Steamrail's range of day tours from 2019 with heritage diesel S313 assisting.

References

Defunct railway companies of Australia
Railway companies established in 1993
Railway companies disestablished in 2004
Veolia
Australian companies established in 1993
Australian companies disestablished in 2004